Presidency of Rafael Caldera may refer to:
First presidency of Rafael Caldera
Second presidency of Rafael Caldera